California's 28th district may refer to:

 California's 28th congressional district
 California's 28th State Assembly district
 California's 28th State Senate district